Plaza El Coliseo may refer to:

 Plaza El Coliseo (Huancayo), a bull-fighting stadium in Peru
 Plaza El Coliseo (Trujillo), a bull-fighting stadium in Peru